Henri Landwirth (March 7, 1927 – April 16, 2018) was a hotelier, philanthropist, and a Holocaust survivor. He was the founder of Give Kids The World and Dignity U Wear.

Landwirth was born into a Jewish family in Antwerp, in northern Belgium, in 1927. His father was a diamond-cutter. During World War II, Henri and his family were separated and were prisoners in the Nazi death and labor camps. Henri spent the years between ages 13 and 18 in Nazi camps, including Auschwitz and Mauthausen. Both of his parents were killed in the camps, but Henri and his twin sister, Margot, survived. After the war, Landwirth made his way to America.

Landwirth was drafted during the Korean War, and used the G.I. Bill to take a course in hotel management while working the night desk at Manhattan's Wellington Hotel. He first worked in New York City and then in 1954 became manager of the Starlite Motel in Cocoa Beach, Florida.  In 1969, he opened a Holiday Inn franchised hotel in Orlando.  Subsequently, Landwirth co-owned a number of hotels in the Central Florida area, including the hotel that is now known as the Seralago Hotel & Suites Main Gate East.

In the 1980s Landwirth started offering free hotel rooms to terminally ill children for the Make-A-Wish Foundation. After a child died before travel arrangements could be made, he made a “vow that no child in need would ever be failed again,” and in 1986, Landwirth founded Give Kids The World, a nonprofit resort that provides vacations to children with critical illnesses and their families.

Landwirth wrote a memoir, Gift of Life in 1996.  The movie Borrowing Time made in 2006, followed Landwirth as he sought to grapple with his past, and featured some of the people who knew Landwirth including John Glenn.

Landwirth died on April 16, 2018 at the age of 91.

References

1927 births
2018 deaths
People from Antwerp
Belgian philanthropists
Belgian Jews
Belgian emigrants to the United States
American people of Belgian-Jewish descent
Mauthausen concentration camp survivors
Auschwitz concentration camp survivors
20th-century philanthropists